David Chiwanga was a Malawian Member of Parliament who was one of the Mwanza Four. He was the MP for the Chikwawa District and was thought to be a secret critic of President Kamuzu Banda. He disappeared in 1983 together with three cabinet ministers: Dick Matenje, Aaron Gadama, and Twaibu Sangala. Their deaths were ruled accidental by Kamuzu Banda. In 1995, seven people, including Kamuzu Banda, were brought to trial over the deaths but were acquitted due to lack of evidence.

References 

1983 deaths
Year of birth missing
Members of the National Assembly (Malawi)